The Hunger of Sejanoz is a gamebook by Joe Dever. It is the twenty-eighth book of the award-winning Lone Wolf book series. It was the last book to be released in the New Order series for the next eighteen years as the 29th book of the series, The Storms of Chai, was published in 2016.

Gameplay
In a game book, the reader makes choices to effect the outcome of the story. Lone Wolf books rely on a combination of thought and luck. Certain statistics such as combat skill and endurance attributes are determined randomly before play (reading). The player then chooses which Kai disciplines or skills they possess. This number depends directly on how many books in the series have been completed ("Kai rank"). With each additional book, the player chooses one additional Kai discipline.  In this first book, the player starts with five disciplines.

Plot
The reader plays as one of Lone Wolf's Grand Masters. On a visit to the court of Xo-lin, news of an invasion force by the Autarch Sejanoz of Bhanar brought to the palace in Pensei. Xo-lin must be rescued and brought to sanctuary in the distant city of Tazhan across the Lissanian Plain.

Reception
The Hunger of Sejanoz was the last of Dever's Lone Wolf books to be published before a hiatus of eighteen years. The original version of the book is rare and sells for hundreds of dollars where copies exist. Also, the omission of 50 extra sections is controversial, as most Lone Wolf books have 350 sections and this one only 300. To have this book published in 1998, Joe Dever was forced into an uncomfortable compromise - the publisher would only print the book if it contained 300 sections. Ever since Joe Dever announced that he would republish the whole series in a Collector's Edition format, his plan was to extended this book to 350 sections. With the author's death in 2016, the new 50 sections added to the Collector's Edition of the book, planned to be released in 2022, were written by his son Ben Devere and longtime collaborator Vincent Lazzari.

References

External links
Gamebooks - Lone Wolf
Origins of Lone Wolf

Lone Wolf (gamebooks)
1998 fiction books